Fernando Ortiz Arana (born October 26, 1944 in Santiago de Querétaro) is a Mexican politician and long serving legislator affiliated with the Institutional Revolutionary Party (PRI).

Ortiz Arana is the son of José Ortiz Antañana, a real estate agent, and Virginia Arana Morán. He graduated from the Autonomous University of Queretaro in 1967 with a bachelor's degree in law.

He joined the Institutional Revolutionary Party in 1963 and chaired it in the late 1990s. He has also served three terms as a federal congressman, as the President of the Chamber of Deputies in 1991, one term as a senator and has run unsuccessfully for governor in 1997 and in 2003.

References

Source: Diccionario biográfico del gobierno mexicano, Ed. Fondo de Cultura Económica, Mexico, 1992.

1944 births
Living people
Members of the Senate of the Republic (Mexico)
Members of the Chamber of Deputies (Mexico)
Presidents of the Chamber of Deputies (Mexico)
Presidents of the Senate of the Republic (Mexico)
Mexican people of Basque descent
Autonomous University of Queretaro alumni
Presidents of the Institutional Revolutionary Party
Politicians from Querétaro
21st-century Mexican politicians
People from Querétaro City
20th-century Mexican politicians